Bowgreave is a village in the parish of Barnacre-with-Bonds, Lancashire, England. Its nearest town is Garstang, a mile to the north.

Garstang Community Academy is a secondary school within the village.

See also

Listed buildings in Barnacre-with-Bonds

References

Villages in Lancashire
Geography of the Borough of Wyre